Alamut is a region in Iran including western and eastern parts in the western edge of the Alborz (Elburz) range, between the dry and barren plain of Qazvin in the south and the densely forested slopes of the Mazandaran province in the north. Starting from Qazvin toward Alamut, passing through the first range of hills, curvatures, forms, are significant themes in nature's composition of this area. The famous Ismaili castle of Alamut and numerous others are in this area, which served as the heartland of the state founded by Hassan-i Sabbah.

According to some sources, the majority of people in northern Qazvin (Alamut) are Tats who speak a dialect of the Tati language. However, other sources claim that the majority of people in Alamut are Mazanderani or Gilaks who speak a dialect of the Mazanderani language or Gilaki language. According to some linguists, the term ‘Tati’ was used by Turkic speakers to refer to non-turkic speakers. This could explain why some sources claim the people of Alamut are Tats, while others claim they are Mazanderanies or Gilaks. Likely, the ‘Tats’ of Alamut are Mazanderani or Gilak speakers who have been labeled as Tats as historically they were considered Mazanderani or Gilaks.

Name

Alamut, historically known as Rudbar or Rudbar of Alamut ( Rūdbār-i Alamūt), named after the Shahrud river.

More precisely, Alamut is a small region in the historical Rudbar in which the namesake castle is located.

History

In 1090 CE, Hassan-i Sabbah, the leader of the Assassins, a sect of Nizari Ismailis in Iran, chose the Alamut region as his headquarters to campaign, preach and convert new followers. This proved to be a turning point for the destiny of Alamut Valley. The result of over two centuries of Ismailite stronghold, the region witnessed numerous castles throughout, of which at least 20 "castles" dating back to this era have been identified. The most magnificent castle in the Alamut Valley is the Alamut Castle, which is built on top of a high rock reaching 2163 m above sea level near the Gazor Khan Village. Currently, only ruins of the fort and some towers are apparent, and it is only through archaeological excavation that the main portions can be discovered.

Lords of Alamut Castle who ruled the Nizārī Ismā'īlī state from Alamūt 

Today, the leader of the contemporary Ismaili community is the Aga Khan.

Alamut rulers 

 Hassan-i Sabbah
 Kia Bozorg Omid 
 Muḥammad ibn Kiyā Buzurg-Ummīd 
 Ali al-Hadi ibn Nizar 
 Al-Muhtadi (Nizari imam) 
 Al-Qahir (Imam) 
 Hasan Alâ Zikrihi’s Selâm 
 Nūr al-Dīn Muḥammad II
 Jalaluddin Hasan
 ‘Alā’ ad-Dīn Muḥammad III
 Ruknu-d-Dīn Khurshāh (The last ruler of the Alamut Castle)

See also 
 Alamut River
 List of Ismaili castles
 Alamut-e Gharbi District
 Alamut-e Sharqi District
 Alamut-e Bala Rural District
 Alamut-e Pain Rural District
  Kıyâmet-i Kûbrâ 
 Alamut, novel written by Vladimir Bartol in 1938
 Alam-Kuh

References

Further reading